Jada is a town and Local Government Area of Adamawa State, Nigeria. Jada, as a local government area, was excavated (given birth to ) from Ganye local government Area of adamawa state Nigeria. "Ganye" the food basket of adamawa state is still the mother of the whole chamba land under the leadership of Alhaji. Adamu Sanda (first class chief) and Gangwari of Ganye local government area. Ganye, Jada, Toungo, and some part of Mayo Belwa,  the Four (4) listed Local government are occupied by Chamba people (samba or sama).

Local Government Areas in Adamawa State